Gabriel Ignacio Rojas Muñoz (born 9 March 1999) is a Chilean professional footballer who plays as a forward for Colchagua in the Segunda División Profesional de Chile.

Club career
Rojas signed for Santiago Wanderers in 2012. After five years in the youth ranks, he made his senior debut during September 2017 in a Copa Chile win versus Iberia. A month later, Rojas appeared in league football for the first time when he was selected for the second half of a fixture with Colo-Colo on 15 October. In July 2019, Rojas agreed a loan deal with Segunda División team San Marcos. Seven appearances followed as they won promotion as champions.

On second half 2022, he left Santiago Wanderers and joined Colchagua in the Segunda División Profesional de Chile.

International career
Internationally, Rojas played for Chile U16s and was also selected for U20 training in July 2017.

At under-20 level, Rojas represented Chile in the 2018 South American Games, winning the gold medal.

Career statistics
.

Honours
Santiago Wanderers
Copa Chile: 2017

San Marcos
Segunda División: 2019

Chile U20
 South American Games Gold medal: 2018

References

External links

1999 births
Living people
People from Valparaíso Province
Chilean footballers
Chile youth international footballers
Chile under-20 international footballers
South American Games gold medalists for Chile
South American Games medalists in football
Competitors at the 2018 South American Games
Association football forwards
Chilean Primera División players
Primera B de Chile players
Segunda División Profesional de Chile players
Santiago Wanderers footballers
San Marcos de Arica footballers
Deportes Colchagua footballers
21st-century Chilean people